The 230th Infantry (Coastal Defense) Division ( or ) was created in April 1942 for the defense of Alta in the Norwegian Finnmark.

The division was a non-standard organization, consisting mostly of a collection of fortress infantry battalions.

Organization 
Structure of the division:

 Headquarters at Northern Norway
 349th Grenadier Regiment
 859th Fortress Grenadier Regiment
 930th Artillery Battalion
 930th Tank Destroyer Company
 930th Engineer Company (Later Battalion)
 930th Signal Company
930th Divisional Supply Group

Commanders 

 Generalmajor Otto Schonheer
 Generalmajor Konrad Menkel
 Generalleutnant Albrecht Baier
 Generalmajor Benhard Pampel

References 

 Wendel, Marcus (2004). "230. Küste-Abwehr-Infanterie-Division". Retrieved April 7, 2005.
 "230. Infanterie-Division". German language article at www.lexikon-der-wehrmacht.de. Retrieved April 7, 2005.

German units in the Arctic
Military units and formations established in 1942
Infantry divisions of Germany during World War II
Military units and formations disestablished in 1945